The group stage of the 2013–14 CONCACAF Champions League was played from August 6 to October 24, 2013. A total of 24 teams competed in the group stage.

Draw
The draw for the group stage was held on June 3, 2013, 20:00 EDT (UTC−4), at the InterContinental Hotel at Doral in Miami.

The 24 teams were drawn into eight groups of three, with each group containing one team from each of the three pots. The allocation of teams into pots was based on their national association and qualifying berth. Teams from the same association (excluding "wildcard" teams which replace a team from another association) could not be drawn with each other in the group stage, and each group was guaranteed to contain a team from either the United States or Mexico, meaning U.S. and Mexican teams could not play each other in the group stage.

Seeding
The following were the group stage seeding of the 24 teams which qualified for the Champions League:

Format
In the group stage, each group was played on a home-and-away round-robin basis. The winners of each group advanced to the championship stage.

Tiebreakers
In each group, teams are ranked according to points (3 points for a win, 1 point for a draw, 0 points for a loss). If tied on points, tiebreakers are applied in the following order:
Greater number of points earned in matches between the teams concerned
Greater goal difference in matches between the teams concerned
Greater number of goals scored away from home in matches between the teams concerned
Reapply first three criteria if two or more teams are still tied
Greater goal difference in all group matches
Greater number of goals scored in group matches
Greater number of goals scored away in all group matches
Drawing of lots

Groups
The matchdays were August 6–8, August 20–22, August 27–29, September 17–19, September 24–26, and October 22–24, 2013.

All times U.S. Eastern Daylight Time (UTC−4)

Group 1

Group 2

Group 3

Group 4

Group 5

Group 6

Group 7

Group 8

References

External links
CONCACAF Champions League, CONCACAF.com

1